Awar is a Ramu language spoken in three villages in Yawar Rural LLG, Madang Province, Papua New Guinea.

References

Ottilien languages
Languages of Madang Province